China Air may refer to:
 Air China, the flag carrier and one of the major airlines of the People's Republic of China
 China Airlines, both the flag carrier and the largest airline of Republic of China (commonly known as Taiwan)